Chuadanga Stadium is an multi-purpose stadium located at Chuadanga Sadar Upazila, Chuadanga, Bangladesh. Chuadanga Stadium built in 2012.

See also
 Stadiums in Bangladesh
 List of cricket grounds in Bangladesh

References

Cricket grounds in Bangladesh
Football venues in Bangladesh